William Edwin Harvey (August 6, 1871 – January 13, 1922) was a lawyer and U.S. Army officer in the late 19th and early 20th centuries. He lived in the Washington, D.C., area for much of his life.

Biography
Harvey was born on August 6, 1871, in Kirkwood, Missouri. He received an LL.B. from Columbian University (now George Washington University Law School) in 1893 and an LL.M. from Columbian in 1894. A lawyer, Harvey practiced in Washington, D.C., and was a member of King and King and Associates from 1893 to 1919.

Harney joined the District of Columbia National Guard in 1890 and rose through the ranks. On June 4, 1915, he was appointed as the brigadier general in command of the district militia. He became a brigadier general (NA) on August 22, 1917, and assumed command over the 75th Infantry Brigade at Camp Shelby. He was then transferred and became the commanding general of the First Provisional Brigade Army Troops. Harvey was honorably discharged on May 9, 1918.

Harvey lived in the D.C. neighborhood of Chevy Chase until his death on January 13, 1922. He was buried at Arlington National Cemetery.

Personal life
Harvey married Katherine E. Heydrick on February 12, 1896. He was an Episcopalian.

References

Bibliography

1871 births
1922 deaths
People from Kirkwood, Missouri
People from Washington, D.C.
19th-century American lawyers
20th-century American lawyers
United States Army generals of World War I
United States Army generals
National Guard (United States) generals
George Washington University Law School alumni
Burials at Arlington National Cemetery